Konséquéla is a town and rural commune in the Cercle of Koutiala in the Sikasso Region of southern Mali. The commune covers an area of 656 square kilometers and includes 16 settlements. In the 2009 census it had a population of 31,007. The town of  Konséquéla, the administrative centre (chef-lieu) of the commune, is 45 km west of Koutiala.

References

External links
.

Communes of Sikasso Region